Filippo Baggio (born 5 June 1988 in Cittadella) is an Italian cyclist.

Palmares
2009
1st Circuito del Porto
2012
3rd Gran Premio della Costa Etruschi
2013
3rd Coppa Bernocchi

References

1988 births
Living people
Italian male cyclists
Cyclists from the Province of Padua
21st-century Italian people